Egert Bakalli (born 22 January 1976) is an Albanian football retired midfielder, who last played for KF Partizani Tirana in Albania. He has previously played for KS Elbasani, Dinamo Tirana and KF Tirana.

Honours
 Winner of the Albanian Superliga 2001–2002 with Dinamo Tiranë
 Winner of the Albanian Superliga 2006–2007 with KF Tirana
 Winner of the Albanian Cup 2003 with Dinamo Tiranë
 Winner of the Albanian Supercup 2006 with KF Tirana
 Winner of the Albanian Supercup 2007 with KF Tirana

References 
 

1976 births
Living people
Footballers from Tirana
Albanian footballers
Association football midfielders
FK Dinamo Tirana players
KS Sopoti Librazhd players
Besa Kavajë players
KF Bylis Ballsh players
KF Tirana players
KF Elbasani players
FK Partizani Tirana players